Robert Struckl (9 June 1918 – 9 October 2013) was an Austrian sprinter. He competed in the men's 100 metres at the 1936 Summer Olympics.

References

1918 births
2013 deaths
Athletes (track and field) at the 1936 Summer Olympics
Austrian male sprinters
Olympic athletes of Austria
Place of birth missing